The Old U.S. Post Office in Ripley, Mississippi was built in 1938.  It served as a post office until c. 2000.  It was listed on the National Register of Historic Places in 2000.

It is a vernacular brick building with brick laid in English bond.  Its front central doorway is flanked by wooden pilasters and has a seven-light transom.  Its front windows are 8 over 12 sash windows, with limestone lintels and sills.

References

Government buildings completed in 1938
Colonial Revival architecture in Mississippi
National Register of Historic Places in Tippah County, Mississippi
Post office buildings on the National Register of Historic Places in Mississippi